Joseph "Jef" Planckaert (4 May 1934 – 22 May 2007) was a Belgian racing cyclist. He is seen as one of the best Belgian cyclists of the 1950s and 1960s.

His best season was 1962, when on the citadel of Namen he became Belgian champion, won Paris–Nice and the Tour de Luxembourg, won Liège–Bastogne–Liège, and finished second in the Tour de France. He also won Omloop Het Volk in 1958, and Four Days of Dunkirk in 1957, 1960 and 1963.

In the Tour de France he finished 6 times in the top 20 in the final standings. In 1961 he won the 6th stage. In 1962, Planckaert wore the yellow jersey for 7 consecutive days. Planckaert retired in 1965.

Major results

1954
Gent-Staden
GP d'Isbuerges
Liedekerke
Langemark
1955
Omloop der Zuid-West-Vlaamse Bergen
Kuurne – Brussel – Kuurne
1956
Moorsele
Zwevegem
Kortrijk
1957
Diksmuide
Four days of Dunkirk
Sint-Amands
1958
Trofeo Fenaroli
Omloop Het Volk
Zwevegem
1959
Nationale sluitingsprijs
Beernem
Braine-le-Comte
1960
Kuurne – Brussel – Kuurne
Four days of Dunkirk
Vichte
1961
Handzame
Gullegem
Oostende
Zwevegem
Wortegem
1962
Bellegem
Grand Prix du Parisien
Paris–Nice
Liège–Bastogne–Liège
Tour de Luxembourg
 national road race champion
Zwevegem
Visé
1963
Ploërdut
Handzame
Four days of Dunkirk
Kortrijk
Wortegem
1964
GP du Tournaisis
Stadsprijs Geraardsbergen
Wetteren
Kemzeke
1965
Ruiselede

Tour de France results 
 1957 Tour de France – 16th
 1958 Tour de France – 6th
 1959 Tour de France – 17th
 1960 Tour de France – 5th
 1961 Tour de France – 15th; winner 6th stage
 1962 Tour de France – 2nd
 1965 Tour de France – 56th

Teams 
 1954 – Alcyon-Dunlop
 1955 – Elvé-Peugeot
 1956 – Elvé-Peugeot
 1957 – Peugeot-BP
 1958 – Carpano
 1959 – Carpano
 1960 – Flandria-Wiel's
 1961 – Wiel's-Flandria
 1962 – Flandria-Faema
 1963 – Faema-Flandria
 1964 – Flandria-Romeo
 1965 – Solo-Superia

References

External links 

 
 Official Tour de France results for Jef Planckaert

1934 births
2007 deaths
Belgian male cyclists
People from Poperinge
People from Zwevegem 
Tour de Suisse stage winners
Sportspeople from West Flanders